Ivan Lönnberg (12 November 1891, Stockholm - 26 April 1918, Cachy) was a Swedish modernist painter. In style he was close to the Swedish painters of his generation known as "" ("The Young") which included Isaac Grünewald and Birger Simonsson.

Life and career
He studied art at a private school operated by Carl Wilhelmson.

After World War I broke out, he joined the French Foreign Legion. He was mortally wounded by a shot in his left eye at the Western Front in 1918, the year the war ended.

Lönnberg was also a long-distance runner. He was part of Sweden's marathon team at the 1912 Summer Olympics, but he and five of his teammates were unable to complete the race, due to being made ill by the intense summer heat.

His production was quite small. Roughly 50 works are known, including those from art school and several self-portraits. Most of his paintings are at the Moderna museet in Stockholm. In a memorial exhibition in 1942, 48 of his works were shown. There are several portraits of him made by his artist friends, such as Dardel.

References

External links

More works by Lönnberg @ ArtNet

1891 births
1918 deaths
20th-century Swedish painters
Swedish male painters
Modernism
Soldiers of the French Foreign Legion
Athletes (track and field) at the 1912 Summer Olympics
Swedish male long-distance runners
Swedish male marathon runners
Olympic athletes of Sweden
Sportspeople from Stockholm
French military personnel killed in World War I
20th-century Swedish male artists